Jason Christie (born 22 December 1990) is a New Zealand professional racing cyclist, who currently rides for UCI Continental team . In January 2016 he won the New Zealand National Road Race Championships, therefore becoming the first world number one of the newly established UCI World Ranking.

Major results

2011
 1st  Time trial, National Under-23 Road Championships
 4th Time trial, Oceania Under-23 Road Championships
 6th Time trial, UCI Under-23 Road World Championships
 8th Chrono Champenois
 10th Overall Tour of Wellington
2012
 2nd Time trial, National Under-23 Road Championships
 Oceania Under-23 Road Championships
3rd  Road race
4th Time trial
2013
 1st Stage 1 Tour de Ijen
 1st Stage 3 New Zealand Cycle Classic
 4th Time trial, Oceania Road Championships
2014
 National Road Championships
3rd Time trial
4th Road race
2015
 1st Tour de Okinawa
 2nd Overall New Zealand Cycle Classic
1st Stage 1
 3rd Road race, National Road Championships
 Oceania Road Championships
6th Time trial
10th Road race
 7th Chrono Champenois
2016
 1st  Road race, National Road Championships
 1st Stage 4 Tour de Ijen
 1st Stage 1 Tour de Flores
2017
 National Road Championships
2nd Time trial
2nd Road race
 4th Time trial, Oceania Road Championships
2018
 National Road Championships
1st  Road race
3rd Time trial
2019
 Oceania Road Championships
2nd  Road race
2nd  Time trial
 5th Tour de Okinawa
2022
 2nd  Time trial Oceania Road Championships

References

External links
 

1990 births
Living people
New Zealand male cyclists
Sportspeople from Ashburton, New Zealand
Cyclists at the 2018 Commonwealth Games
Commonwealth Games competitors for New Zealand
20th-century New Zealand people
21st-century New Zealand people